The 2005 FIBA Under-21 World Championship was an international basketball competition, held from 5 to 14 August 2005, in Córdoba and Mar de Plata, Argentina. It was the last edition of the FIBA Under-21 World Championship. Twelve national teams competed in the tournament. 

Lithuania won their first title, after defeating Greece in the final.

Qualified teams
Iran originally qualified for the finals, but withdrew after refusing to issue a visa because the Iranian government refused to play against Israel.

Preliminary round
All times are local (UTC–3).

Group A

Group B

9th–12th place playoffs

9th–12th place semifinals

11th place match

9th place match

Championship playoffs

Quarterfinals

5th–8th place semifinals

Semifinals

7th place match

5th place match

3rd place match

Final

Final standings

References

FIBA Under-21 World Championship
International basketball competitions hosted by Argentina
2005 in Argentine sport
2005 in basketball
Sport in Mar del Plata